Robert Gibb Howitt (15 July 1925 – 31 January 2005) was a Scottish footballer who played in the Football League for Sheffield United and Stoke City.

Career
Howitt started his career in Scotland at Vale of Clyde and Partick Thistle before moving to England with Sheffield United. He made a decent start to English football scoring 14 goals in 44 appearances in 1955–56 as the "Blades" suffered relegation from the First Division. He hit 13 the following season as Sheffield United finished in 6th position in the second tier. He then only scored four in 22 matches in 1957–58 and at the end of the season he signed for league rivals Stoke City. He made fine start to his Stoke career scoring on his debut against Charlton Athletic in a 2–1 victory. He occupied all forward positions in 1958–59 scoring ten goals. New manager Tony Waddington began to use Howitt in a left half position in 1960–61 which saw his goalscoring suffer as a result. However, he began consistent playing in 45 matches in 1961–62 but he often came in for criticism from supporters due to his lack of skill. He played 11 matches in 1962–63 as Stoke won the Second Division and at the end of the season he left to return to Scotland.

He went on to coach at Greenock Morton and was appointed manager of Motherwell in 1965. He spent seven year as manager at Fir Park guiding the "Wells" to the Scottish League Division Two title in 1968–69.

Career statistics
Source:

Honours
 Stoke City
 Football League Second Division champions: 1962–63

References

External links
 

1929 births
2005 deaths
Footballers from Glasgow
Association football inside forwards
Scottish footballers
Stoke City F.C. players
Sheffield United F.C. players
Partick Thistle F.C. players
Vale of Clyde F.C. players
Scottish Junior Football Association players
Scottish Football League players
English Football League players
Greenock Morton F.C. non-playing staff
Scottish Football League representative players
Scottish Football League managers
Scottish football managers